Miriam Corsini (born 5 May 1989 in Milan, Italy) is an Italian-Mozambican swimmer specializing in Sprint breaststroke. In the 2011, she won the silver medal in the 50 breaststroke, at the All-Africa Games. In the 2013, she was the first Mozambican swimmer to obtain the qualifying time for the 15th FINA World Championships.

References

External links
  La «piccola italiana» che nuota per il Mozambico 
 Children of Italy denied Balotelli and all the rest

1989 births
Living people
Swimmers from Milan
Italian female breaststroke swimmers
Mozambican female breaststroke swimmers
African Games silver medalists for Mozambique
African Games medalists in swimming
Competitors at the 2011 All-Africa Games
Italian people of Mozambican descent